Martin Stixrud (9 February 1876 – 8 January 1964) was a Norwegian figure skater. He was the 1920 Summer Olympics bronze medalist, 1923 European silver medalist, and 1912 European bronze medalist.

He was 44 years old when he won the Olympic bronze medal. He is the second oldest person ever to win an Olympic medal in an individual winter sport.

He later coached Sonja Henie. He was born and died in Oslo.

He studied in Oslo together with Sonja Henie and Erna Andersen.

Results

References

External links

Navigation

1876 births
1964 deaths
Norwegian male single skaters
Figure skaters at the 1920 Summer Olympics
Olympic figure skaters of Norway
Olympic bronze medalists for Norway
Sportspeople from Oslo
Olympic medalists in figure skating
European Figure Skating Championships medalists
Medalists at the 1920 Summer Olympics
Norwegian figure skating coaches